Kalim Uddin Ahmed is a Bangladesh Nationalist Party politician and the former Member of Parliament of Sunamganj-5.

Career
Ahmed was elected to parliament from Sunamganj-5 as a Bangladesh Nationalist Party candidate in 2001.

References

Bangladesh Nationalist Party politicians
Living people
8th Jatiya Sangsad members
Year of birth missing (living people)
People from Chhatak Upazila